Boys Town, officially Father Flanagan's Boys' Home, is a non-profit organization based in Boys Town, Nebraska, dedicated to caring for children and families.

History

Boys Town was founded on December 12, 1917, as an orphanage for boys. Originally known as "The City of Little Men", the organization was begun by Edward J. Flanagan, a Roman Catholic priest, while he worked in the Diocese of Omaha. Using a loan of $90, he first rented a home at 25th and Dodge streets, in Omaha, to care for five boys, the first of whom was named John Kresse. From these beginnings, the City of Little Men developed new juvenile care methods in 20th-century America, emphasizing "social preparation as a model for public boys' homes worldwide".

1921–1948: Father Flanagan develops Boys Town 
In 1921, Father Flanagan purchased Overlook Farm on the outskirts of Omaha and moved his boys' home there. The move to Overlook Farm was a major step in Father Flanagan's plan to create a developed community. In time, the Home became known as the Village of Boys Town. By the 1930s, hundreds of boys lived at the Village, which was developed to include a school, dormitories, and administration buildings. The boys elected their own government, including a mayor, council and commissioners. In 1936, the community of Boys Town was designated as an official village in the state of Nebraska.

By the late 1930s, Boys Town's development and staff efforts to court public support had made it the subject of many newspaper and magazine articles. In 1938, producers from MGM Studios traveled to Boys Town to discuss the prospects of a movie about the Home. A few months later, Spencer Tracy and Mickey Rooney, two of the biggest stars of the day, and a 61-member crew arrived at Boys Town to begin ten days of on-location filming. After Tracy won an Academy Award for his role, the Academy had another statuette inscribed, for Father Flanagan.

On May 15, 1948, Father Flanagan suffered a fatal heart attack in Berlin, Germany. By the time of his death, daily life for the boys in the Village had become a mix of school, work, play, and family togetherness. The "City of Little Men" was thriving and so were its young citizens.

1948–1972: Monsignor Nicholas H. Wegner 
In September, the new archbishop of Omaha, Gerald T. Bergan, named Monsignor Nicholas H. Wegner as Boys Town's second executive director. Monsignor Wegner aspired to continue his predecessor's expansion plans, double Boys Town's population, and attain financial security for the Home in keeping with Father Flanagan's intentions. From a waiting list of three thousand boys, Monsignor Wegner took in about fifty boys each month. The best records available indicate that the Home's population peaked at 880, in the 1960s.

Fundraising controversy and resignation 
Boys Town's fundraising practices drew scrutiny in 1972 after the Omaha Sun, a local newspaper, investigated the nonprofit after a tip from local Omaha businessman Warren Buffett. The charity was found to have an endowment of over $191 million in 1971, enough to place it at #230 on the Fortune 500, yet continued to fundraise even with a shrinking population and no new expansion projects. Monsignor Wegner was forced to resign and temporarily halted its fundraising activities. The Omaha Sun received the Pulitzer Prize for Local Investigative Specialized Reporting in 1973 for the story.

1973–1985: Monsignor Hupp  
The Diocese of Omaha and Boys Town contracted with the consulting firm Booz Allen Hamilton Inc. to assess its future. Their multi-volume study recommended that Boys Town expand its programs and services into new areas, while continuing to raise funds. The study identified societal changes that made providing group care of the boys in dormitory settings ineffective, and proposed approaches to offer more individualized care for children.

In addition, in June 1972 the Home announced a new longterm goal: the board of trustees had approved development of the Boys Town Institute for Communication Disorders in Children (eventually to be renamed Boys Town National Research Hospital®), at a cost of $30 million. The board had heard a presentation given by Patrick E. Brookhouser, MD, and John E. Bordley, MD.

The outstanding issue was how to provide the best and most effective care for the boys who were already at Boys Town and those who would follow. The youths struggled with drug and alcohol addictions, divorce of parents, poverty, suicide attempts, neglect, and physical and sexual abuse.

On October 11, 1973, Monsignor Robert P. Hupp was named the third national executive director of Boys Town. Monsignor Hupp inherited a population of boys he called "social orphans". They had family lives disrupted by issues identified above.

Monsignor Hupp was determined to pioneer new methods and directions of care, and give programs and ideas a chance to succeed, stating, "We must never be content to stand still when children are at risk."

Family Home programs 
Spaces were redesigned and new ones built in order to provide care for children in family-style settings, as recommended by Booz Allen Hamilton. Boys Town staff were trained in the Teaching-Family Model® developed at Achievement Place at the University of Kansas in Lawrence. The Teaching-Family Model had developed from collaboration between the Bureau of Child Research in Lawrence and the Center for Crime and Delinquency at the National Institute of Mental Health. The primary objectives of the Teaching-Family Model were to develop a community-based, family-style, skill-oriented group home treatment for disadvantaged and delinquent youth. The model was intended to be effective, economical, beneficial, and replicable by other programs.

In late 1974, Boys Town hired its first "Family-Teachers®", a married couple who would begin caring for a small group of youth in a former cottage being converted into a "Family Home®". Three other couples were hired soon after. That core group worked with other staff members to develop formal training materials for the Family-Teachers who were being recruited. As new couples were trained, they moved into sixteen newly built homes as well the remaining converted cottages. By the end of 1975, the last of the dormitories was closed and the transition to the Boys Town Family Home Program was complete.

Monsignor Hupp was determined to transform Boys Town so it could meet the changing needs of children. As the Family Home Program became more established, the Village began to look like the community of care Father Flanagan had envisioned in the early days of Boys Town.

Under the new youth care system, each Family Home in the Village housed eight to ten boys. (Eventually, the Village would comprise seventy Family Homes.) The boys were of various ages, races, and ethnic and religious backgrounds, and they came to Boys Town from across the country. Each Family Home was headed by a Family-Teaching Couple, who lived with the boys seven days a week, twenty-four hours a day, meeting their daily needs, providing supervision and guidance, teaching them social skills, and providing a caring and loving home environment.

Boys Town's new residential program emphasized teaching emotional skills and relationship building. The program focused care and treatment on correcting inappropriate behaviors by teaching youth alternative positive behaviors and social skills (following instructions, accepting "No" for an answer, respecting authority) and encouraging and reinforcing their positive behavior. The Family-Teachers had the main responsibility for this skill building, as they were the boys' primary caregivers. Teachers in Boys Town's schools also reinforced this work, as did coaches and instructors in other extracurricular activities. A consistent learning environment was developed with clear expectation for behavior by youth. Family-Teachers and other staff were also charged with developing positive, trusting relationships with the youth and modeling for the boys how they could develop healthy relationships with others.

Religious education and practice had been part of Boys Town's youth care approach since the days of Father Flanagan. In the new Family Home Program, a boy's spiritual development played a major role in treatment. It was the responsibility of the Family Home, church, and school. Family-Teachers were asked to respect and enhance the religious traditions of Boys Town youth without proselytizing or "forcing" religious practices on them. Family-Teachers also attended church with their youth, taught proper church behavior, and modeled and taught religious home habits such as prayer, reflection, and study.

Over time, Boys Town would continue to improve on the Teaching-Family Model and enhance its ability to provide the best care possible for troubled youth.

Boys Town begins to include girls 
Monsignor Hupp had experience working with girls and was aware of their problems also. He had served from 1946 to 1950 as chaplain, teacher, and athletic coach for a girls' home run by the Sisters of the Good Shepherd Convent in Omaha.

In 1978, he accepted five girls into the Boys Town residential program in what was to be a small, short-term test. These first girls lived off-campus in a downtown Omaha home owned by Boys Town. In 1979, a few girls were admitted to live in a Family Home on the main campus. More followed and by 1985, twenty-six girls were citizens of Boys Town. "I saw it as an experimental program", Monsignor Hupp said. "I also had trouble convincing the Board of Trustees that accepting girls wasn't a mistake. But when the girls arrived, it actually improved the behavior of the boys."

1985–2005: Father Valentine Peter  
In February 1985, Boys Town was designated a National Historic Landmark District for the significance of its work with children and youth, and was listed on the National Register of Historic Places. Every year, thousands of visitors drive through the shady, tree-lined streets of the Village, with many stopping at Dowd Chapel to visit Father Flanagan's tomb. In the early 21st century, Boys Town is the only National Historic Landmark District in Nebraska.

In 1985, Father Valentine Peter was appointed Boys Town's fourth national executive director. Father Peter wanted to ensure the continued effectiveness of Boys Town's residential program. He also knew the Home had to be prepared for what childcare would look like ten, twenty, or thirty years down the road. He believed Boys Town had to further develop a "continuum of care", using proven childcare technologies. No matter what troubles children brought with them, Boys Town would be prepared and able to provide healing and hope. In 1988, Father Peter led an effort to transfer Boys Town's experience and technology to four new services: Parent Training, Home-Based Services (in-home crisis intervention), Treatment Foster Care, and Shelter Care. Grouped under an umbrella called Family-Based Programs, these services would ultimately become the core of Boys Town's new continuum of care.

The basic question about whether Boys Town's youth care model was replicable had already begun to be answered at the first Boys Town USA site in Tallahassee, Florida. Encouraged by that success and motivated by the clamor for similar services for youth in many other cities, Father Peter planned for a major and rapid expansion. "We're taking our healing out from the Heartland to the whole nation", he said, announcing Boys Town's goal to establish programs in seventeen major metropolitan areas.

Cities where new Boys Town USA affiliate (or national) sites were established included Orlando and West Palm Beach in Florida; San Antonio, Texas; New Orleans, Louisiana; Las Vegas, Nevada; Brooklyn, New York; Newark, New Jersey; Portsmouth, Rhode Island; Orange County, California; Washington, D.C.; Atlanta, Georgia; Philadelphia, Pennsylvania; and Chicago, Illinois.

In its expansion, Boys Town was offering more effective ways to help troubled children and families on a larger scale. Changes acknowledged that youngsters with problems did not necessarily need to be removed and treated away from their families for long periods of time. Increasingly, care organizations believed that it was more beneficial to provide family-based services to both parents and children, providing effective guidance while keeping families together, although these kinds of services were used only when it was determined that children could safely stay at home and receive adequate care.

In 1989, the National Group Home Program established in 1975 was expanded and renamed the Boys Town National Training Center. Prior to this, Boys Town had provided technical assistance and training to other residential care facilities for youth to replicate Boys Town's methods. Father Peter wanted to influence more childcare providers, including those who wanted to use only some of Boys Town's methods, and others who worked with youth in schools and psychiatric care programs rather than residential settings. With the well-researched, outcomes-oriented techniques Boys Town had developed, they began to share this new knowledge with caregivers who were helping children in different settings.

Over the next decade or so, the National Training Center presented material through workshops, on-site training and consultation, and specialized materials.

In May 1989, Boys Town established a lifeline for troubled children and their parents. The Boys Town National Hotline® was a toll-free crisis number (800-448-3000) that was available twenty-four/seven to callers across the country. Trained professional counselors handled calls on any problem, from drug abuse, sexual abuse, and suicide, to depression and parent-child conflicts.

By 1989, when the Boys Town Institute's name was changed to Boys Town National Research Hospital, the hospital had gained international recognition as a leader in applied medical research and clinical care for children with communication disorders. Under the leadership of Dr. Patrick Brookhouser, the hospital had provided care for nearly 70,000 patients from 2,500 cities in all fifty states and more than a dozen foreign countries. No child was turned away because his or her family was unable to pay for care.

In response to the special needs of these children, the hospital developed new models of care that became standard practices across the country. For example, the hospital developed software that is vital to universal newborn hearing screening. This technology detects hearing loss within hours of birth. Such early detection, combined with early intervention, can significantly reduce communication delays that commonly accompany hearing loss.

By 2005, Boys Town was being recognized as one of the largest and most effective child and family care organizations in the United States.

2005–present: Father Steven Boes  
In 2005, the board chose Father Steven Boes, another priest with Nebraska ties and experience working with children, as Boys Town's fifth national executive director.

Developing a strategic plan was a major goal for Boys Town in the first few years Father Boes was on the job. Boys Town wanted to double the number of children and families it served by providing a wider spectrum of connected, consistent services and resources.

In 2008, Father Boes launched Boys Town's first five-year strategic plan, which introduced a refined version of what was now called the Integrated Continuum of Care and established a road map for implementing the continuum's multiple services and programs at Boys Town sites nationwide. The continuum, a tightly connected spectrum of service levels based on the research-proven Boys Town Model of care, would serve as the centerpiece as Boys Town moved forward and outward.

At the same time, Boys Town National Research Hospital, under the direction of Dr. Patrick Brookhouser, was expanding its services through its new hospital in the Village of Boys Town and its new pediatric care clinics across the city of Omaha. This partnership, which combined life-changing youth care and health care services, would further differentiate Boys Town from other providers and ensure that children and families received the right care, at the right time, in the right way.

In 2007, Boys Town provided direct youth care services to 13,033 boys and girls nationwide. In 2011, that number had skyrocketed to 28,065. Also, Boys Town health care programs served more than 38,000 children. What had been a five-year goal of the strategic plan—to double the number of kids being helped—was accomplished in four years. Also during this period, the number of people nationally whose lives were being touched by Boys Town youth, health, family, and community programs every year grew to 1.6 million.

Boys Town knew there would always be children who need the intensive, skills-focused intervention provided through its Family Home Program. These children have been removed from their homes and families due to serious problems and challenges and could get the most benefits from successfully completing a service plan in a Boys Town Family Home.

But Boys Town also understood the value of keeping troubled families together whenever possible and providing care and assistance to the whole family in their home. That is why, starting in 2008, Boys Town initiated a major internal culture shift, redirecting its focus to serving more children while they remained with their own families. Not only was this a more cost-efficient approach than depending heavily or solely on out-of-home placements, but it also could produce many of the same positive outcomes as residential services because all services were based on the same model of care.

By 2011, of the nearly 29,000 children Boys Town served across the nation, 75 percent of them safely and effectively received care while living with their own families. This was significantly higher than the 30 percent of children who received services through Boys Town in-home programs in 2007. In 2013, of the 35,500 children and families directly served by Boys Town, 92 percent received services while children lived in their homes. This focus on preventive in-home care would continue into the future.

2015 abuse case
In 2015, a former supervisor at a Boys Town group treatment home was convicted of having sex with a minor, aged 17.  The offender, a 32-year-old woman, was sentenced to five years probation. On appeal, the conviction was affirmed by the Supreme Court of Nebraska.

Facilities

The national headquarters of Boys Town is in the village of Boys Town, Nebraska, which was listed on the National Register of Historic Places, and was designated a National Historic Landmark, on February 4, 1985.

Facilities include the Hall of History, dedicated to the history of Boys Town; the restored home of Father Flanagan; the Dowd Memorial Chapel and the Chambers Protestant Chapel; and the Leon Myers Stamp Center. The latter provides historical stamp-collecting exhibits and sells donated stamps to provide support for Boys Town programs.

It has a summer camp on West Lake Okoboji, located near West Okoboji, Iowa.

Hospitals and clinics
In 1977, Boys Town founded and continues to operate the Boys Town National Research Hospital, located at 555 N. 30th Street in Omaha. Its sister hospital, Boys Town National Research Hospital – West, is operated on the Boys Town campus. The NPO also operates several medical clinics in Nebraska, and one in Iowa.

Logo
In 1943, Boys Town adopted as its image and logo a picture of a boy carrying a younger boy on his back, captioned "He ain't heavy, Father, he's my brother", a phrase originating with the United Free Church of Scotland. They felt it epitomized the importance of their residents caring for each other and having someone care about them. The saying inspired a song and album by the Hollies.

National locations
Boys Town has grown over the years, providing care to children and families across the country. There are nine sites across the United States, in Central Florida, North Florida, South Florida, Louisiana, Nebraska, Iowa, New England, Nevada, and Washington, D.C.

References

External links
 
 Case studies of Boys Town, Mackinac Center for Public Policy
 "Nebraska: Boys Town Bonanza", Time, April 10, 1972.
 "Education: Rebuilding Boys Town", Time, August 5, 1974.
 Durham Museum Boys Town exhibit

1917 establishments in the United States
Organizations established in 1917
Charities based in Nebraska
Social welfare charities based in the United States
Orphanages in the United States
National Historic Landmarks in Nebraska
National Register of Historic Places in Omaha, Nebraska
History of Omaha, Nebraska by community area
Buildings and structures in Nebraska
Museums in Omaha, Nebraska
Philatelic museums in the United States
Historic house museums in Nebraska
History museums in Nebraska
Historic districts on the National Register of Historic Places in Nebraska